The Railway Heritage Centre is a railway museum–cum–heritage centre for rail exhibits at Tiruchirappalli, Tamil Nadu, India.

Overview 
In addition, it also provides interesting historic developments of South Indian Railway Company and its timeline.

Exhibits 
The museum which is a part of erstwhile South Indian Railway’s sesquicentennial celebrations, and has both indoor and outdoor exhibits. Some of the indoor exhibits include old documents and digital archives (rare photographs, maps, gazettes, railway manuals and books used during the British Raj) and epoch artefacts (old lamps used at stations made up of "China glass", clocks, bells, staff badges, etc.). The outdoor exhibits include a couple of vintage locomotive engines and a functional toy train.

Recreation 
There are toy trains for the children, shady alcoves as well as local eateries.

See also

 National Rail Museum, New Delhi
 Rewari Railway Heritage Museum
 Regional Railway Museum, Chennai
 Railway Museum Mysore
 Joshi's Museum of Miniature Railway

References

External links 
 Southern Railway – Official Website

TIRUCHIRAPPALLI
Children's museums in India
Museums established in 2014
2014 establishments in Tamil Nadu

Museums in Tiruchirappalli
Rail transport in Tiruchirappalli